Sarja may refer to;

Finland topics
MTV Sarja, Finnish TV station
SM-sarja, Finland's top-level ice hockey league from 1928 to 1975
Suomi-sarja, Finland's third-highest ice hockey league

Villages in Syria
Sarja, Syria
Sarja Sharkiya
Western Sarja

Indian surname
Arjun Sarja (born 1962), Indian actor, producer and director
Chiranjeevi Sarja (born 1984), Indian film actor
Dhruva Sarja (born 1988), Indian film actor

Other uses
Sarja (film), a 1987 Marathi film